The chapters of the Japanese manga series X, also known as X/1999 are written and illustrated by Clamp, a creative team of four manga authors. It started serialization in Kadokawa Shoten's Monthly Asuka shōjo manga magazine in May 1992. The story takes place at the end of days, in the year 1999. The series follows Kamui Shiro, a young esper who returns home to Tokyo after a six-year absence to face his destiny as the one who will determine humanity's fate.

Publishing the series in Japan proved troublesome on account of its disasters it shown which were reminiscent of ones that happened in Japan such as earthquakes or murders committed by juveniles. Serialization stopped in March 2003 and in March 2005 Clamp stated they were searching for a proper magazine to conclude it. The chapters have been collected in a total of eighteen tankōbon volumes with the first one released on July 29, 1992, and the eighteenth on September 17, 2002. On September 26, 2006, Kadokawa Shoten published Clamp Newtype Platinum, a special Clamp edition of Newtype. The issue includes the "X 18.5" supplement, a re-print of five previously uncollected chapters. The series was originally expected to reach twenty-one volumes upon completion. The X manga has also been adapted into various anime, including a feature film, an original video animation and a TV series.

The North American version of the manga, retitled X/1999, was serialized in Viz Media's Animerica Extra and released in tankōbon form under the Shōjo imprint. In July 2001, Viz Media removed the series from Animerica Extra due to licensing issues, but it later returned in its issue published in March 2003. All the eighteen volumes have been released by Viz Media as of May 10, 2005. By April 2010, manga editor Carl Gustav Horn Carl from Dark Horse Comics stated they would not license the series until it finished in Japan; Viz Media still maintains the licence to the English edition of X. In March 2011, Viz Media announced they would release an "omnibus" edition of the series which collects three volumes in one. Its first volume was published on November 7, 2011. 


Volume list

X 18.5
Originally published in the Newtype, Clamp's latest chapters of X written before the series was published on hiatus were collected in both the magazine as well and the guidebook All About Clamp.

References

External links

X/1999
X (manga)